Castel Camponeschi (Italian for Camponeschi Castle)  is a  Middle Ages castle in Prata d'Ansidonia, Province of L'Aquila (Abruzzo).

History

Architecture

References

External links

Camponeschi
Prata d'Ansidonia